Owlang or Aulang or Olang or Ulang may refer to:
 Olang, Golestan
 Ulang, Golestan
 Owlang, South Khorasan
 Owlang, Zanjan
 Owlang-e Amanabad, Razavi Khorasan Province
 Olang-e Asadi, Razavi Khorasan Province